Mollabürhanlı (also, Mollaburkhanly and Mollabyurkhanly) is a village and municipality in the Khachmaz Rayon of Azerbaijan.  It has a population of 927.  The municipality consists of the villages of Mollabürhanlı, Maşioba, and Çuxuroba.

References 

Populated places in Khachmaz District